The Free State Cheetahs (formerly the Orange Free State), currently named the Toyota Free State Cheetahs, for sponsorship reasons, are a South African rugby union team that participates in the annual Currie Cup tournament. They are governed by the Free State Rugby Union and are based at the 48,000 capacity Free State Stadium in Bloemfontein. The Cheetahs have won the Currie Cup six times, with five of the wins coming since 2005, including winning the cup three times consecutively from 2005 to 2007. Since the advent of professionalism in rugby union, they have been considered one of South Africa's "Big 5" provincial rugby Unions.

The Cheetahs are a very well supported team across the Free State as well having large fan bases in Cape Town, Johannesburg and Pretoria. They are also known as the darlings of South African rugby, with many other South African rugby fans adopting them as their second team especially when they take on any of the other "Big 5" teams. The Cheetahs average home crowds of approximately 17,000 in the Currie Cup when they play at Free State Stadium in Bloemfontein. Their biggest rivals are traditionally Western Province. However, in recent times the Blue Bulls have also become fierce rivals of the Cheetahs.

History

The Orange Free State Rugby Union was established in 1895, but did not make it to their first Currie Cup final appearance until 1973, when they lost to Northern Transvaal 30-22 at Loftus Versfeld. Just two seasons later, the Orange Free State met Northern Transvaal again in the Currie Cup final, losing 12-6 at the Free State Stadium in Bloemfontein. The following season, Orange Free State met the Western Province in the final, defeating them 33-16 in Bloemfontein, claiming their first Currie Cup championship. The next season, Orange Free State met Northern Transvaal in the Currie Cup final again, though Northern Transvaal defeated them 27-12 in Pretoria. For the fourth successive time, Orange Free State were in the final again, and again with Northern Transvaal, who defeated them 13-9.

They met Northern Transvaal in the 1981 season final. Northern Transvaal won 23-16. The Orange Free State/Free State Cheetahs made two final appearances in the 1990s, being runners-up to Transvaal and the Western Province in 1994 and 1997 respectively. In 2004, they were runners-up to the Blue Bulls in the final. However, the following season, the Free State defeated them in the final, 29 points to 25. The Free State finished at the top of the table of the 2006 season, and defeated the Sharks in their home semi to advance to their third final in as many years. The Cheetahs hosted the final, which ended in a 28-all draw after 20 minutes of extra-time.

In the 2007 season, the FS Cheetahs continued their great form, winning 13 of the 14 games before the finals. After beating the Blue Bulls in the semis at home, they won the Currie Cup for a third consecutive time by coming from behind to beat the Golden Lions by 20-18 in the final.

In the 2016 season, they emerged undefeated in the Currie Cup, and beat the Blue Bulls in the final 36 - 16.

Other teams

In addition to the Free State Cheetahs that play in the Currie Cup competition, a Free State XV also compete in the Vodacom Cup / Currie Cup qualification series on an annual basis. This team play their matches at the same time as the Super Rugby season, with the majority of Free State Cheetahs first team squad in action for the  Super Rugby franchise. While the Free State XV's matches are classified as first class matches by the South African Rugby Union, they are not included in the Free State Rugby Union for their annual capping ceremony.

In previous seasons, an Emerging Cheetahs team also participated in first class compulsory friendly matches prior to the Currie Cup season.

Currie Cup finals

1 Transvaal are now known as the Golden Lions.
2 Orange Free State were renamed the Free State Cheetahs.
3 Northern Transvaal were renamed the Blue Bulls.
4 Game was a draw after 80+20minutes, thus the cup was shared.

Vodacom Cup finals

Bankfin Nite Series finals

Current squad
The following players were included in the Free State Cheetahs squad for the 2023 Currie Cup Premier Division:

Springboks

References

External links
 Official website

Rugby clubs established in 1895
South African rugby union teams
Bloemfontein
Sport in the Free State (province)
1895 establishments in the Orange Free State